Savoy Pictures Entertainment, Inc. was an American independent motion picture company in operation from 1992 to 1997. Among Savoy Pictures' noteworthy feature films were A Bronx Tale, No Escape, Last of the Dogmen and Serial Mom.

History 
Former Columbia Pictures Entertainment chairman and TriStar Pictures founder Victor A. Kaufman became chairman and chief executive officer of Savoy Pictures in 1992 along with vice chairman executive, Lewis J. Korman. Kaufman has claimed that the name came from the Savoy Special bat Robert Redford's character used in The Natural. Savoy intended to finance and distribute films in the $12–25 million range, investing in up to $15 million per film. In June of that year, Savoy entered into a deal with HBO for the home video, pay-TV, and pay-per-view rights to its films.

Budgets for their films grew. However, with rather poor marketing, Savoy faced a major financial slump, only three years after being formed. For three years, Savoy then released box office failures including Exit to Eden and Getting Away with Murder. It also didn't help that two of its competitors in the independent film field, Miramax and New Line Cinema, were bought out by majors (The Walt Disney Company and Turner Broadcasting, respectively), giving them stability. As a result, Savoy focused on low-budget films and the occasional blockbuster, costing up to $80 million. Executives hoped to lure Sylvester Stallone with a then-hefty $20 million paycheck to star in a studio project that was ultimately never made.

In the meantime, Savoy expanded into broadcasting to help the investment of films. In March 1994, Savoy created SF Broadcasting as a venture with Fox Television Stations, with Kaufman and Korman owning controlling interest. As a result of purchasing these stations, all of them would become affiliates of the Fox network. Stations owned by SF Broadcasting were WALA-TV in Mobile, Alabama, WLUK-TV in Green Bay, Wisconsin, WVUE in New Orleans, and KHON-TV in Honolulu, Hawaii. Savoy also launched a television production division.

In January 1995, Kaufman announced that he was hiring Robert N. Fried to run the motion picture studio. Fried brought in executives Alan Sokol, Bob Levin, Cathy Schulman, Stan Brooks, Stan Wlodkowski and filmmakers Sam Raimi, and George Tillman, Rob Weiss and Peter Chelsom. In September 1995, Kaufman announced that he was cutting back on his interest in the motion picture business and was re-positioning the company as a television station holding company.

Shortly thereafter, Savoy announced the sale of 14 films in its roster, in varying stages of production, to potential buyers. New Line Cinema picked up Martin Lawrence's directorial debut A Thin Line Between Love and Hate, American History X, The Adventures of Pinocchio, Heaven's Prisoners, Faithful, and The Stupids. Paramount Pictures picked up the rights to produce A Simple Plan.

Savoy Pictures announced in November 1995 that Barry Diller's Silver King Communications was going to acquire Savoy for $210 million. The deal was finalized in 1997. Victor Kaufman is now vice chairman and sits on the board of directors of IAC. The SF stations were sold to Diller's Silver King Broadcasting in 1997.

Cineplex Odeon Films was the Canadian distributor for Savoy films, then Alliance Films became the Canadian distributor after New Line Cinema picked up the later films from 1996.

In 2006, the Savoy library was purchased by Universal Studios through Focus Features, with the exceptions of a few select titles. Warner Bros. Discovery owns the titles produced by New Line Cinema, while Paramount Global owns the titles produced by Rysher Entertainment, and Joel B. Michaels owns the rights to "Last of the Dogmen."

Films

References 

Defunct American film studios
Defunct television broadcasting companies of the United States
Defunct film and television production companies of the United States
Film production companies of the United States
Film distributors of the United States
American companies established in 1992
Entertainment companies established in 1992
Entertainment companies disestablished in 1997
Mass media companies established in 1992
Mass media companies disestablished in 1997
American independent film studios